Guy "Ducky" Lookabaugh (May 26, 1896 – September 10, 1981) was an American football player, wrestler, and coach of football, basketball, and wrestling, and college athletics administrator. He competed in the freestyle welterweight event at the 1924 Summer Olympics. Lookabaugh served as the head football coach at Northeastern State Teachers College—now known as Northeastern State University—in Tahlequah, Oklahoma from 1929 to 1935 and at Grinnell College in Grinnell, Iowa from 1936 to 1939. He was also the head basketball coach at Northeastern State from 1929 to 1934. Lookabaugh played college football at Oklahoma Agricultural and Mechanical College—now known as Oklahoma State University–Stillwater. He was an assistant football coach and head wrestling coach at the University of Kansas in the late 1920s.

Lookabaugh graduated from Oklahoma A&M in 1925 with a Bachelor of Science degree in physical education. He later earned a master's degree in physical education from the University of Iowa. In 1940, Lookabaugh was appointed Oklahoma's state supervisor of community service for the Works Projects Administration (WPA).

Head coaching record

College football

References

External links
 
 

1896 births
1981 deaths
American male sport wrestlers
Grinnell Pioneers football coaches
Kansas Jayhawks football coaches
Kansas Jayhawks wrestling coaches
Northeastern State RiverHawks athletic directors
Northeastern State RiverHawks football coaches
Northeastern State RiverHawks men's basketball coaches
Oklahoma State Cowboys football players
Oklahoma State Cowboys wrestlers
Olympic wrestlers of the United States
Wrestlers at the 1924 Summer Olympics
High school football coaches in Oklahoma
University of Iowa alumni
Works Progress Administration administrators
People from Watonga, Oklahoma
Coaches of American football from Oklahoma
Players of American football from Oklahoma
Basketball coaches from Oklahoma